CJWV-FM (96.7 MHz) is a commercial radio station in Peterborough, Ontario. The station broadcasts an classic hits format, switching to Christmas music for part of November and December. It is owned by My Broadcasting Corporation and is branded as Oldies 96.7.

History
Owned by Pineridge Broadcasting, the station was authorized on May 8, 2008. Corus Entertainment's CKRU-FM had also applied to use the 96.7 MHz frequency, but had to select a different FM frequency (100.5 MHz).

On May 11, 2011, the station signed on the air as Magic 96.7 with an adult contemporary format. The CJWV-FM call sign was formerly used at a radio station in Winnipeg, Manitoba. CJWV-FM's morning program was hosted by broadcaster Dan Duran and actress Linda Kash.

On September 1, 2015, CJWV was purchased by My Broadcasting Corporation as part of the acquisition of Pineridge Broadcasting Inc. On September 2, 2015, CJWV switched to an oldies format as Oldies 96.7.

References

External links
Oldies 96.7

JWV
JWV
Radio stations established in 2011
2011 establishments in Ontario
JWV